Ali Rasso Dido (born 23 October 1961) is a Kenyan politician who has been United Republican Party member of the National Assembly for Saku since March 2013.

He was educated at King's College London (MA Defence Studies, 1999) the Open University (MBA, 2003) and the University of Nairobi.

References

1961 births
Living people
Alumni of King's College London
Alumni of the Open University
University of Nairobi alumni
Members of the National Assembly (Kenya)
United Republican Party (Kenya) politicians